Cancer can be treated by surgery, chemotherapy, radiation therapy, hormonal therapy, targeted therapy (including immunotherapy such as monoclonal antibody therapy) and synthetic lethality, most commonly as a series of separate treatments (e.g. chemotherapy before surgery). The choice of therapy depends upon the location and grade of the tumor and the stage of the disease, as well as the general state of the patient (performance status). Cancer genome sequencing helps in determining which cancer the patient exactly has for determining the best therapy for the cancer. A number of experimental cancer treatments are also under development. Under current estimates, two in five people will have cancer at some point in their lifetime.

Complete removal of the cancer without damage to the rest of the body (that is, achieving cure with near-zero adverse effects) is the ideal, if rarely achieved, goal of treatment and is often the goal in practice. Sometimes this can be accomplished by surgery, but the propensity of cancers to invade adjacent tissue or to spread to distant sites by microscopic metastasis often limits its effectiveness; and chemotherapy and radiotherapy can have a negative effect on normal cells. Therefore, cure with nonnegligible adverse effects may be accepted as a practical goal in some cases; and besides curative intent, practical goals of therapy can also include (1) suppressing the cancer to a subclinical state and maintaining that state for years of good quality of life (that is, treating the cancer as a chronic disease), and (2) palliative care without curative intent (for advanced-stage metastatic cancers).

Because "cancer" refers to a class of diseases, it is unlikely that there will ever be a single "cure for cancer" any more than there will be a single treatment for all infectious diseases. Angiogenesis inhibitors were once thought to have potential as a "silver bullet" treatment applicable to many types of cancer, but this has not been the case in practice.

Types of treatments
The treatment of cancer has undergone evolutionary changes as understanding of the underlying biological processes has increased. Tumor removal surgeries have been documented in ancient Egypt, hormone therapy and radiation therapy were developed in the late 19th century. Chemotherapy, immunotherapy and newer targeted therapies are products of the 20th century. As new information about the biology of cancer emerges, treatments will be developed and modified to increase effectiveness, precision, survivability, and quality of life.

Surgery
In theory, non-hematological cancers can be cured if entirely removed by surgery, but this is not always possible. When the cancer has metastasized to other sites, especially if the metastases are to sites far away from the original tumor (in other words, distant metastases, rather than local or regional ones) in the body prior to surgery, complete surgical excision is usually impossible. In the Halstedian model of cancer progression, tumors grow locally, then spread to the lymph nodes, then to the rest of the body. This has given rise to the popularity of local-only treatments such as surgery for small cancers. Even small localized tumors are increasingly recognized as possessing metastatic potential.

Examples of surgical procedures for cancer include mastectomy for breast cancer, prostatectomy for prostate cancer, and lung cancer surgery for non-small cell lung cancer. The goal of the surgery can be either the removal of only the tumor, or the entire organ. A single cancer cell is invisible to the naked eye but can regrow into a new tumor, a process called recurrence. For this reason, the pathologist will examine the surgical specimen to determine if a margin of healthy tissue is present, thus decreasing the chance that microscopic cancer cells are left in the patient.

In addition to removal of the primary tumor, surgery is often necessary for staging, e.g. determining the extent of the disease and whether it has metastasized to regional lymph nodes. Staging is a major determinant of prognosis and of the need for adjuvant therapy. Occasionally, surgery is necessary to control symptoms, such as spinal cord compression or bowel obstruction. This is referred to as palliative treatment.

Surgery may be performed before or after other forms of treatment. Treatment before surgery is often described as neoadjuvant. In breast cancer, the survival rate of patients who receive neoadjuvant chemotherapy are no different from those who are treated following surgery. Giving chemotherapy earlier allows oncologists to evaluate the effectiveness of the therapy, and may make removal of the tumor easier. However, the survival advantages of neoadjuvant treatment in lung cancer are less clear.

Radiation therapy

Radiation therapy (also called radiotherapy, X-ray therapy, or irradiation) is the use of ionizing radiation to kill cancer cells and shrink tumors by damaging their DNA (the molecules inside cells that carry genetic information and pass it from one generation to the next), making it impossible for these cells to continue to grow and divide. Radiation therapy can either damage DNA directly or create charged particles (free radicals) within the cells that can in turn damage the DNA. Radiation therapy can be administered externally via external beam radiotherapy (EBRT) or internally via brachytherapy. The effects of radiation therapy are localised and confined to the region being treated. Although radiation damages both cancer cells and normal cells, most normal cells can recover from the effects of radiation and function properly. The goal of radiation therapy is to damage as many cancer cells as possible, while limiting harm to nearby healthy tissue. Hence, it is given in many fractions, allowing healthy tissue to recover between fractions.

Radiation therapy may be used to treat almost every type of solid tumor, including cancers of the brain, breast, cervix, larynx, liver, lung, pancreas, prostate, skin, stomach, uterus, or soft tissue sarcomas. Radiation is also used to treat leukemia and lymphoma. Radiation dose to each site depends on a number of factors, including the radio sensitivity of each cancer type and whether there are tissues and organs nearby that may be damaged by radiation. Thus, as with every form of treatment, radiation therapy is not without its side effects.

Radiation therapy can lead to dry mouth from exposure of salivary glands to radiation, resulting in decreased saliva secretion. Post therapy, the salivary glands will resume functioning but rarely in the same fashion. Dry mouth caused by radiation can be a lifelong problem.

Radiation might not be a choice of treatment if the tumour was diagnosed in late stages or is in a vulnerable location, as radiation might be more likely to cause damage to organs at effective doses. Moreover, radiation therapy for patients under 14 can cause particularly significant long-term side effects, such as hearing loss and blindness, that influence the lifestyle of the young patients. Children who had received cranial radiotherapy are deemed at a high risk for academic failure and cognitive delay.

A study by Reddy A.T. determined the significant decrease in IQ with higher doses of radiation, specifically for children with brain tumours. Alternative treatments, such as surgical resection, may be used in young patients to decrease the occurrence of side effects.

Chemotherapy

Chemotherapy is the treatment of cancer with drugs ("anticancer drugs") that can destroy cancer cells.  Chemotherapy can be given in a variety of ways such as injections into the muscles, skin, artery, or vein, or it could even be taken by mouth in the form of a pill. In current usage, the term "chemotherapy" usually refers to cytotoxic drugs which affect rapidly dividing cells in general, in contrast with targeted therapy (see below). Chemotherapy drugs interfere with cell division in various possible ways, e.g. with the duplication of DNA or the separation of newly formed chromosomes. Most forms of chemotherapy target all rapidly dividing cells and are not specific to cancer cells, although some degree of specificity may come from the inability of many cancer cells to repair DNA damage, while normal cells generally can. Hence, chemotherapy has the potential to harm healthy tissue, especially those tissues that have a high replacement rate (e.g. intestinal lining). These cells usually repair themselves after chemotherapy.

Because some drugs work better together than alone, two or more drugs are often given at the same time. This is called "combination chemotherapy"; most chemotherapy regimens are given in a combination.

Since chemotherapy affects the whole body, it can have a wide range of side effects. Patients often find that they start losing their hair since the drugs that are combatting the cancer cells also attack the cells in the hair roots. This powerful treatment can also lead to fatigue, loss of appetite, and vomiting depending on the person.

The treatment of some leukaemias and lymphomas requires the use of high-dose chemotherapy, and total body irradiation (TBI). This treatment ablates the bone marrow, and hence the body's ability to recover and repopulate the blood. For this reason, bone marrow, or peripheral blood stem cell harvesting is carried out before the ablative part of the therapy, to enable "rescue" after the treatment has been given. This is known as autologous stem cell transplantation.

Targeted therapies

Targeted therapy, which first became available in the late 1990s, has had a significant impact in the treatment of some types of cancer, and is currently a very active research area. This constitutes the use of agents specific for the deregulated proteins of cancer cells. Small molecule targeted therapy drugs are generally inhibitors of enzymatic domains on mutated, overexpressed, or otherwise critical proteins within the cancer cell. Prominent examples are the tyrosine kinase inhibitors imatinib (Gleevec/Glivec) and gefitinib (Iressa).

Monoclonal antibody therapy is another strategy in which the therapeutic agent is an antibody which specifically binds to a protein on the surface of the cancer cells. Examples include the anti-HER2/neu antibody trastuzumab (Herceptin) used in breast cancer, and the anti-CD20 antibody rituximab, used in a variety of B-cell malignancies.

Targeted therapy can also involve small peptides as "homing devices" which can bind to cell surface receptors or affected extracellular matrix surrounding the tumor. Radionuclides which are attached to these peptides (e.g. RGDs) eventually kill the cancer cell if the nuclide decays in the vicinity of the cell. Especially oligo- or multimers of these binding motifs are of great interest, since this can lead to enhanced tumor specificity and avidity.

Photodynamic therapy (PDT) is a ternary treatment for cancer involving a photosensitizer, tissue oxygen, and light (often using lasers). PDT can be used as treatment for basal cell carcinoma (BCC) or lung cancer; PDT can also be useful in removing traces of malignant tissue after surgical removal of large tumors. In February 2019, medical scientists announced that iridium attached to albumin, creating a photosensitized molecule, can penetrate cancer cells and, after being irradiated with light, destroy the cancer cells.

High-energy therapeutic ultrasound could increase higher-density anti-cancer drug load and nanomedicines to target tumor sites by 20x fold higher than traditional target cancer therapy.

Targeted therapies under pre-clinical development as potential cancer treatments include morpholino splice switching oligonucleotides, which induce ERG exon skipping in prostate cancer models, multitargeted kinase inhibitors that inhibit the PI3K with other pathways including MEK and PIM, and inhibitors of NF-κB in models of chemotherapy resistance.

Immunotherapy

Cancer immunotherapy refers to a diverse set of therapeutic strategies designed to induce the patient's own immune system to fight the tumor. Contemporary methods for generating an immune response against tumours include intravesical BCG immunotherapy for superficial bladder cancer, and use of interferons and other cytokines to induce an immune response in renal cell carcinoma and melanoma patients. Cancer vaccines to generate specific immune responses are the subject of intensive research for a number of tumours, notably malignant melanoma and renal cell carcinoma. Sipuleucel-T is a vaccine-like strategy in late clinical trials for prostate cancer in which dendritic cells from the patient are loaded with prostatic acid phosphatase peptides to induce a specific immune response against prostate-derived cells.

Allogeneic hematopoietic stem cell transplantation ("bone marrow transplantation" from a genetically non-identical donor) can be considered a form of immunotherapy, since the donor's immune cells will often attack the tumor in a phenomenon known as graft-versus-tumor effect. For this reason, allogeneic HSCT leads to a higher cure rate than autologous transplantation for several cancer types, although the side effects are also more severe.

The cell based immunotherapy in which the patients own Natural Killer cells(NK) and Cytotoxic T-Lymphocytes(CTL) are used has been in practice in Japan since 1990. NK cells and CTLs primarily kill the cancer cells when they are developed. This treatment is given together with the other modes of treatment such as surgery, radiotherapy or chemotherapy and called as Autologous Immune Enhancement Therapy (AIET).

Immune Checkpoint therapy focuses on two "checkpoint" proteins, cytotoxic T-lymphocyte–associated antigen 4 (CTLA-4) and programmed death 1 (PD-1). Under normal conditions, the immune system utilizes checkpoint proteins as negative feedback mechanisms to return to homeostasis once pathogens have been cleared from the body. In tumor microenvironment, cancer cells can commandeer this physiological regulatory system to "put a brake" on the anti-cancer immune response and evade immune surveillance. 2018 Nobel Prize in medicine is awarded to Dr. James Allison of University of Texas MD Anderson Cancer Center in U.S. and Dr. Tasuku Honjo Kyoto University in Japan for their contributions in advance of PD-1 and CTLA-4 immune checkpoint therapy.

Hormonal therapy

The growth of some cancers can be inhibited by providing or blocking certain hormones. Common examples of hormone-sensitive tumors include certain types of breast and prostate cancers. Blocking estrogen or testosterone is often an important additional treatment. In certain cancers, administration of hormone agonists, such as progestogens may be therapeutically beneficial. Although the side effects from hormone therapy vary depending on the type, patients' can experience symptoms such as hot flashes, nausea, and fatigue.

Angiogenesis inhibitors

Angiogenesis inhibitors prevent the extensive growth of blood vessels (angiogenesis) that tumors require to survive. Some, such as bevacizumab, have been approved and are in clinical use. One of the main problems with anti-angiogenesis drugs is that many factors stimulate blood vessel growth in cells normal or cancerous. Anti-angiogenesis drugs only target one factor, so the other factors continue to stimulate blood vessel growth. Other problems include route of administration, maintenance of stability and activity and targeting at the tumor vasculature.

Exercise prescription

Exercise prescription is becoming a mainstream adjunct treatment for cancer, based on studies which show that exercise (compared to no exercise) is associated with reduced recurrence rates, improved mortality outcomes, reduction of side effects from traditional cancer treatments. Although it is uncertain whether improved outcomes with exercise are correlated or causative, the benefit-risk ratio of including exercise as part of cancer treatment is large, as exercise has further benefits (e.g. cardiovascular, mental health) without major risks, although there is a small risk of overuse injury if added too aggressively. Exercise physiologists and exercise medicine specialists can assist oncologists and primary care practitioners with exercise prescription in cancer patients.

Synthetic lethality

Synthetic lethality arises when a combination of deficiencies in the expression of two or more genes leads to cell death, whereas a deficiency in only one of these genes does not. The deficiencies can arise through mutations, epigenetic alterations or inhibitors of one or both of the genes.

Cancer cells are frequently deficient in a DNA repair gene. (Also see DNA repair deficiency in cancer.) This DNA repair defect either may be due to mutation or, often, epigenetic silencing (see epigenetic silencing of DNA repair). If this DNA repair defect is in one of seven DNA repair pathways (see DNA repair pathways), and a compensating DNA repair pathway is inhibited, then the tumor cells may be killed by synthetic lethality. Non-tumorous cells, with the initial pathway intact, can survive.

Ovarian cancer
Mutations in DNA repair genes BRCA1 or BRCA2 (active in homologous recombinational repair) are synthetically lethal with inhibition of DNA repair gene PARP1 (active in the base excision repair and in the microhomology-mediated end joining pathways of DNA repair).

Ovarian cancers have a mutational defect in BRCA1 in about 18% of patients (13% germline mutations and 5% somatic mutations) (see BRCA1). Olaparib, a PARP inhibitor, was approved in 2014 by the US FDA for use in BRCA-associated ovarian cancer that had previously been treated with chemotherapy. The FDA, in 2016, also approved the PARP inhibitor rucaparib to treat women with advanced ovarian cancer who have already been treated with at least two chemotherapies and have a BRCA1 or BRCA2 gene mutation.

Colon cancer

In colon cancer, epigenetic defects in the WRN gene appear to be synthetically lethal with inactivation of TOP1. In particular, irinotecan inactivation of TOP1 was synthetically lethal with deficient expression of the DNA repair WRN gene in patients with colon cancer. In a 2006 study, 45 patients had colonic tumors with hypermethylated WRN gene promoters (silenced WRN expression), and 43 patients had tumors with unmethylated WRN gene promoters, so that WRN protein expression was high. Irinotecan was more strongly beneficial for patients with hypermethylated WRN promoters (39.4 months survival) than for those with unmethylated WRN promoters (20.7 months survival). The WRN gene promoter is hypermethylated in about 38% of colorectal cancers.

There are five different stages of colon cancer, and these five stages all have treatment:
Stage 0, is where the patient is required to undergo surgery to remove the polyp (American Cancer Society).
Stage 1, depending on the location of the cancer in the colon and lymph nodes, the patient undergoes surgery just like Stage 0.
Stage 2 patients undergoes removing nearby lymph nodes, but depending on what the doctor says, the patent might have to undergo chemotherapy after surgery (if the cancer is at higher risk of coming back). 
Stage 3, is where the cancer has spread all throughout the lymph nodes but not yet to other organs or body parts. When getting to this stage, Surgery is conducted on the colon and lymph nodes, then the doctor orders Chemotherapy (FOLFOX or CapeOx) to treat the colon cancer in the location needed (American Cancer Society). The last a patient can get is Stage 4. 
Stage 4 patients only undergo surgery if it is for the prevention of the cancer, along with pain relief. If the pain continues with these two options, the doctor might recommended radiation therapy. The main treatment strategy is chemotherapy due to how aggressive the cancer becomes in this stage, not only to the colon but to the lymph nodes.

Cancer pain management

Symptom control and palliative care 
Although the control of the symptoms of cancer is not typically thought of as a treatment directed at the cancer, it is an important determinant of the quality of life of cancer patients, and plays an important role in the decision whether the patient is able to undergo other treatments. In general, doctors have the therapeutic skills to reduce pain including, chemotherapy-induced nausea and vomiting, diarrhea, hemorrhage and other common problems in cancer patients. The multidisciplinary specialty of palliative care has increased specifically in response to the symptom control needs for these groups of patients.

Pain medication, such as morphine, oxycodone, and antiemetics are drugs to suppress nausea and vomiting. These are very commonly used in patients with cancer-related symptoms. Improved antiemetics such as ondansetron and analogues, as well as aprepitant have made aggressive treatments much more feasible in cancer patients.

Cancer pain can be associated with continuing tissue damage due to the disease process, or the treatment (i.e. surgery, radiation, chemotherapy).  There is always a role for environmental factors and affective disturbances in the genesis of pain behaviors, However these are not usually the predominant etiologic factors in patients with cancer pain. Some patients with severe pain associated with cancer are nearing the end of their lives, but in all cases, palliative therapies should be used to control the pain. Issues such as the social stigma of using opioids and health care consumption can be concerns and may need to be addressed for the person to feel comfortable taking the medications required to control his or her symptoms. The typical strategy for cancer pain management is to get the patient as comfortable as possible using the least amount of medications possible, even if that means using opioids, surgery, and physical measures.

Historically, doctors were reluctant to prescribe narcotics to terminal cancer patients due to addiction and respiratory function suppression. The palliative care movement, a more recent offshoot of the hospice movement, has engendered more widespread support for preemptive pain treatment for cancer patients. The World Health Organization also noted uncontrolled cancer pain as a worldwide problem and established a "ladder" as a guideline for how practitioners should treat pain in patients who have cancer

Cancer-related fatigue is a very common problem for cancer patients, and has only recently become important enough for oncologists to suggest treatment, even though it plays a significant role in many patients' quality of life.

Mental Struggles/Pain 
Cancer patients undergo many obstacles and one of these includes mental strain. It is very common for cancer patients to become stressed, overwhelmed, uncertain, and even depressed. The use of chemo is a very harsh treatment causing the cells of the body to die. Physical effects like this do not only inflict pain but also cause patients to become mentally exhausted and want to give up. For a lot of reasons including these, hospitals offer many types of therapy and mental healing. Some of these include yoga, meditation, communication therapy, and spiritual ideas. All of these are meant to calm and relax the mind, or to give hope for the patients that may feel drained.

Insomnia 
A common disorder experienced by people that have survived cancer treatments is insomnia. Almost 60% of cancer survivors experience insomnia, and if it is not treated properly it can have long term effects on physiological and physical health. Insomnia is defined as dissatisfaction with sleep duration or quality and difficulties initiating or maintaining sleep. Insomnia can heavily reduce one's quality of life. Cognitive behavioral therapy has been seen to reduce insomnia and depression for cancer survivors.

Muscle Strength 
Decreased muscle strength is a common side effect to many different cancer treatments. Because of this, exercise is very important especially in the first year after treatment. It has been shown that yoga, water exercise, and pilates can improve the emotional well-being and quality of life of breast cancer survivors.

Hospice in cancer 
Hospice is a group that provides care at the home of a person that has an advanced illness with a likely prognosis of fewer than 6 months. As most cancer treatments involve significant unpleasant side effects, a patient with little realistic hope of a cure or prolonged life may choose to seek comfort care only. This choice of forgoing more radical therapies is an exchange for a prolonged period of normal living. This is an especially important aspect of care for those patients whose disease is not a good candidate for other forms of treatment. In these patients, the risks related to the chemotherapy may be greater than the chance of responding to the treatment, making further attempts to cure the disease impossible. Of note, patients in hospice can sometimes still get treatments such as radiation therapy if it is being used to treat symptoms, not as an attempt to cure cancer. During this phase of cancer, it is also important to note that mental health in patients can be greatly affected.

Advance Care Planning 
Advance Care Planning (ACP) has been suggest to increase the quality of life of cancer survivors. Studies have been done to investigate the effects of ACP on lung, heart, and cancer patients and their relatives and its positive effects with decreasing depression and anxiety. ACP helps adults at any stage of health decide what they want to do with their future, their goals, and their preferences for medical care. It is very important for the patient to have a voice in how they are treated.

Research

Clinical trials, also called research studies, test new treatments in people with cancer. The goal of this research is to find better ways to treat cancer and help cancer patients. Clinical trials test many types of treatment such as new drugs, new approaches to surgery or radiation therapy, new combinations of treatments, or new methods such as gene therapy.

A clinical trial is one of the final stages of a long and careful cancer research process. The search for new treatments begins in the laboratory, where scientists first develop and test new ideas. If an approach seems promising, the next step may be testing a treatment in animals to see how it affects cancer in a living being and whether it has harmful effects. Of course, treatments that work well in the lab or in animals do not always work well in people. Studies are done with cancer patients to find out whether promising treatments are safe and effective.

Patients who take part may be helped personally by the treatment they receive. They get up-to-date care from cancer experts, and they receive either a new treatment being tested or the best available standard treatment for their cancer. At the same time, new treatments also may have unknown risks, but if a new treatment proves effective or more effective than standard treatment, study patients who receive it may be among the first to benefit. There is no guarantee that a new treatment being tested or a standard treatment will produce good results. In children with cancer, a survey of trials found that those enrolled in trials were on average not more likely to do better or worse than those on standard treatment; this confirms that success or failure of an experimental treatment cannot be predicted.

Exosome research
Exosomes are lipid-covered microvesicles shed by solid tumors into bodily fluids, such as blood and urine. Current research is being done attempting to use exosomes as a detection and monitoring method for a variety of cancers. The hope is to be able to detect cancer with a high sensitivity and specificity via detection of specific exosomes in the blood or urine. The same process can also be used to more accurately monitor a patient's treatment progress. Enzyme linked lectin specific assay or ELLSA has been proven to directly detect melanoma derived exosomes from fluid samples. Previously, exosomes had been measured by total protein content in purified samples and by indirect immunomodulatory effects. ELLSA directly measures exosome particles in complex solutions, and has already been found capable of detecting exosomes from other sources, including ovarian cancer and tuberculosis-infected macrophages.

Exosomes, secreted by tumors, are also believed to be responsible for triggering programmed cell death (apoptosis) of immune cells; interrupting T-cell signaling required to mount an immune response; inhibiting the production of anti-cancer cytokines, and has implications in the spread of metastasis and allowing for angiogenesis. Studies are currently being done with "Lectin affinity plasmapheresis" (LAP), LAP is a blood filtration method which selectively targets the tumor based exosomes and removes them from the bloodstream. It is believed that decreasing the tumor-secreted exosomes in a patient's bloodstream will slow down progression of the cancer while at the same time increasing the patients own immune response.

Complementary and alternative

Complementary and alternative medicine (CAM) treatments are the diverse group of medical and health care systems, practices, and products that are not part of conventional medicine and have not been shown to be effective. "Complementary medicine" refers to methods and substances used along with conventional medicine, while "alternative medicine" refers to compounds used instead of conventional medicine. CAM use is common among people with cancer; a 2000 study found that 69% of cancer patients had used at least one CAM therapy as part of their cancer treatment. Most complementary and alternative medicines for cancer have not been rigorously studied or tested. Some alternative treatments which have been investigated and shown to be ineffective continue to be marketed and promoted.

Special circumstances

In pregnancy
The incidence of concurrent cancer during pregnancy has risen due to the increasing age of pregnant mothers and due to the incidental discovery of maternal tumors during prenatal ultrasound examinations.

Cancer treatment needs to be selected to do least harm to both the woman and her embryo/fetus. In some cases a therapeutic abortion may be recommended.

Radiation therapy is out of the question, and chemotherapy always poses the risk of miscarriage and congenital malformations. Little is known about the effects of medications on the child.

Even if a drug has been tested as not crossing the placenta to reach the child, some cancer forms can harm the placenta and make the drug pass over it anyway. Some forms of skin cancer may even metastasize to the child's body.

Diagnosis is also made more difficult, since computed tomography is infeasible because of its high radiation dose. Still, magnetic resonance imaging works normally. However, contrast media cannot be used, since they cross the placenta.

As a consequence of the difficulties to properly diagnose and treat cancer during pregnancy, the alternative methods are either to perform a Cesarean section when the child is viable in order to begin a more aggressive cancer treatment, or, if the cancer is malignant enough that the mother is unlikely to be able to wait that long, to perform an abortion in order to treat the cancer.

In utero
Fetal tumors are sometimes diagnosed while still in utero. Teratoma is the most common type of fetal tumor, and usually is benign. In some cases these are surgically treated while the fetus is still in the uterus.

Racial and social disparities 
Cancer is a significant issue that is affecting the world. Specifically in the U.S, it is expected for there to be 1,735,350 new cases of cancer, and 609,640 deaths by the end of 2018. Adequate treatment can prevent many cancer deaths but there are racial and social disparities in treatments which has a significant factor in high death rates. Minorities are more likely to receive inadequate treatment while white patients are more likely to receive efficient treatments in a timely manner. Having satisfactory treatment in timely manner can increase the patients likelihood of survival. It has been shown that chances of survival are significantly greater for white patients than for African American patients.

The annual average mortality of patients with colorectal cancer between 1992 and 2000 was 27 and 18.5 per 100,000 white patients and 35.4 and 25.3 per 100,000 black patients. In a journal that analyzed multiple studies testing racial disparities when treating colorectal cancer found contradicting findings. The Veterans administration and an adjuvant trial found that there were no evidence to support racial differences in treating colorectal cancer. However, two studies suggested that African American patients received less satisfactory and poor quality treatment compared to white patients. One of these studies specifically was provided by the Center for Intramural Research. They found that black patients were 41% less likely to receive colorectal treatment and were more likely to be hospitalized in a teaching hospital with less certified physicians compared to white patients. Furthermore, black patients were more likely to be diagnosed with oncologic sequelae, which is a severity of the illness in result of poorly treated cancer. Lastly, for every 1,000 patients in the hospital, there were 137.4 black patient deaths and 95.6 white patient deaths.

In a breast cancer journal article analyzed the disparities of breast cancer treatments in the Appalachian Mountains. African American women were found to be 3 times more likely to die compared to Asians and two times more likely to die compared to white women. According to this study, African American women are at a survival disadvantage compared to other races. Black women are also more likely to receive less successful treatment than white women by not receiving surgery or therapy. Furthermore, The National Cancer Institute panel, identified breast cancer treatments, given to black women, as inappropriate and not adequate compared to the treatment given to white women.

From these studies, researchers have noted that there are definite disparities in the treatment of cancer, specifically who have access to the best treatment and can receive it in a timely manner. This eventually leads to disparities between who is dying from cancer and who is more likely to survive.

The cause of these disparities is generally that African Americans have less medical care coverage, insurance and access cancer centers than other races. For an example, black patients with breast cancer and colorectal cancer were shown to be more likely to have medicaid or no insurance compared to other races. The location of the health care facility also plays a role in why African Americans receive less treatment in comparison to other races. However, some studies say that African Americans don't trust doctors and don't always seek the help they need and this explains why there are less African Americans receiving treatment. Others suggest that African Americans seek even more treatment than whites and that it is simply a lack of the resources available to them. In this case, analyzing these studies will identify the treatment disparities and look to prevent them by discovering potential causes of these disparities.

See also 

American Cancer Society
Cancer and nausea
Cancer prevention
Experimental cancer treatment
Global Task Force on Expanded Access to Cancer Care and Control in Developing Countries
List of cancer hospitals
List of unproven and disproven cancer treatments
Timeline of cancer treatment development
Multimodal cancer therapy
World Cancer Day

References

Bibliography
 
 
 
"How Does Radiation Therapy Work?" American Cancer Society. N.p., n.d. Web. 21 March 2017.
 
 
"Radiation Therapy for Brain Cancer | CTCA." CancerCenter.com. N.p., 1 January 0001. Web. 21 March 2017.
"Radiation Therapy for Cancer." National Cancer Institute. N.p., n.d. Web. 21 March 2017.

External links 
 

 
Cancer
Cancer